Mimapatelarthron laosense is a species of beetle in the family Cerambycidae. It was described by Breuning in 1968. It is known from Laos (from which its species epithet is derived).

References

Desmiphorini
Beetles described in 1968